Burundi's relations with its neighbours have often been affected by security concerns. Hundreds of thousands of Burundian refugees have at various times crossed to neighboring Rwanda, Tanzania, and the Democratic Republic of the Congo. Hundreds of thousands of Burundians are in neighboring countries as a result of the ongoing civil war. Most of them, more than 340,000 since 1993, are in Tanzania. Some Burundian rebel groups have used neighboring countries as bases for insurgent activities. The 1993 embargo placed on Burundi by regional states hurt diplomatic relations with its neighbors; relations have improved since the 1999 suspension of these sanctions.

Burundi is a member of various international and regional organizations, including the United Nations, the African Union, the African Development Bank and the Francophonie. The Swedish Minister for Integration and Gender Equality, Nyamko Sabuni, was born in Burundi.

Bilateral relations

Africa

Americas

Asia

Europe

Pacific

See also 
 List of diplomatic missions in Burundi
 List of diplomatic missions of Burundi

References